The Girl In The Tower is a 2017 historical fantasy novel written by Katherine Arden. It is the second novel in the Winternight trilogy. The Girl In The Tower is set in medieval Russia and incorporates elements of Russian folklore.

References

Fantasy novel series
American fantasy novels
Historical fantasy novels
Young adult fantasy novels
2017 fantasy novels
Slavic mythology in popular culture
2017 American novels
Del Rey books